Stefanos Kapias (born 15 February 1984) is a Greek professional footballer who plays as a centre-back for Nafpaktiakos.

References

1984 births
Living people
Greek footballers
Greece under-21 international footballers
Greece youth international footballers
Super League Greece players
Gamma Ethniki players
Football League (Greece) players
Super League Greece 2 players
Apollon Pontou FC players
Anagennisi Karditsa F.C. players
Veria F.C. players
A.E. Karaiskakis F.C. players
Association football defenders
Footballers from Thessaloniki